Pilsbryspira collaris is a species of sea snail, a marine gastropod mollusk in the family Pseudomelatomidae.

Description
The length of the shell varies between 10 mm and 14 mm.

Distribution
This species occurs in the Pacific Ocean from Mazatlan, Mexico to northern Peru.

References

 Sowerby, Proc. Zool. Soc., p. 139
 Casey T.L. (1903). Notes in the Conrad collection of Vicksburg fossils, with descriptions of new species. Proceedings of the Academy of Natural Sciences, Philadelphia 55: 261–283

External links
  W.H. Dall (1909),  Report on the collection of shells from Peru ;Proceedings of the United States National Museum, Vol. 37, pages 147–294, with Plates 20–28
 
 Gastropods.com: Pilsbryspira collaris

collaris
Gastropods described in 1834